Desmond John Lock (born 2 October 1949) is a New Zealand rower.

Lock was born in 1949 in Batu Gajah, Malaysia. He was a member of Petone Rowing Club. He represented New Zealand at the 1976 Summer Olympics in the coxless four in a team with Bob Murphy, Grant McAuley, and David Lindstrom, narrowly beaten by the team from the Soviet Union to fourth place. He is listed as New Zealand Olympian athlete number 356 by the New Zealand Olympic Committee. The 1977 World Rowing Championships saw Lock win silver in the coxless four with Ivan Sutherland, David Lindstrom and Dave Rodger under new coach Harry Mahon.

References

1949 births
People from Perak
Living people
New Zealand male rowers
Rowers at the 1976 Summer Olympics
Olympic rowers of New Zealand
World Rowing Championships medalists for New Zealand